Tokyo Rose (alternative spelling Tokio Rose) was a name given by Allied troops in the South Pacific during World War II to all female English-speaking radio broadcasters of Japanese propaganda. The programs were broadcast in the South Pacific and North America to demoralize Allied forces abroad and their families at home by emphasizing troops' wartime difficulties and military losses. Several female broadcasters operated using different aliases and in different cities throughout the territories occupied by the Japanese Empire, including Tokyo, Manila, and Shanghai. The name "Tokyo Rose" was never actually used by any Japanese broadcaster, but it first appeared in U.S. newspapers in the context of these radio programs during 1943.

During the war, Tokyo Rose was not any one individual, but rather a group of largely unassociated women working for the same propagandist effort throughout the Japanese Empire. In the years soon after the war, the character "Tokyo Rose" – whom the Federal Bureau of Investigation (FBI) now avers to be "mythical" – became an important symbol of Japanese villainy for the United States.  American cartoons, movies, and propaganda videos between 1945 and 1960 tend to portray her as sexualized, manipulative, and deadly to American interests in the South Pacific, particularly by revealing intelligence of American losses in radio broadcasts. Similar accusations concern the propaganda broadcasts of Lord Haw-Haw and Axis Sally, and in 1949 the San Francisco Chronicle described Tokyo Rose as the "Mata Hari of radio".

Tokyo Rose ceased to be merely a symbol during September 1945 when Iva Toguri D'Aquino, a Japanese-American disc jockey for a propagandist radio program, attempted to return to the United States. Toguri was accused of being the "real" Tokyo Rose, arrested, tried, and became the seventh person in U.S. history to be convicted of treason. Toguri was eventually paroled from prison in 1956, but it was more than twenty years later that she received an official presidential pardon for her role in the war.

Iva Toguri and The Zero Hour

Although she broadcast using the name "Orphan Ann", Iva Toguri has been known as "Tokyo Rose" since her return to the United States in 1945. An American citizen and the daughter of Japanese immigrants, Toguri traveled to Japan to tend to a sick aunt just prior to the attack on Pearl Harbor. Unable to leave the country when war began with the United States, unable to stay with her aunt's family as an American citizen, and unable to receive any aid from her parents who were placed in internment camps in Arizona, Toguri eventually accepted a job as a part-time typist at Radio Tokyo (NHK). She was quickly recruited as a broadcaster for the 75-minute propagandist program The Zero Hour, which consisted of skits, news reports, and popular American music.

According to studies conducted during 1968, of the 94 men who were interviewed and who recalled listening to The Zero Hour while serving in the Pacific, 89% recognized it as "propaganda", and less than 10% felt "demoralized" by it. 84% of the men listened because the program had "good entertainment," and one G.I. remarked, "[l]ots of us thought she was on our side all along."

After World War II ended in 1945, the U.S. military detained Toguri for a year before releasing her due to lack of evidence. Department of Justice officials agreed that her broadcasts were "innocuous". But when Toguri tried to return to the United States, an uproar ensued because Walter Winchell (a powerful broadcasting personality) and the American Legion lobbied relentlessly for a trial, prompting the Federal Bureau of Investigation (FBI) to renew its investigation of Toguri's wartime activities. Her 1949 trial resulted in a conviction on one of eight counts of treason.

In 1974, investigative journalists found that important witnesses had asserted that they were forced to lie during testimony. They stated that FBI and US occupation police had coached them for more than two months about what they should say on the stand, and that they had been threatened with treason trials themselves if they did not cooperate. U.S. President Gerald Ford pardoned Toguri in 1977 based on these revelations and earlier issues with the indictment.

Tokyo Mose
Walter Kaner (May 5, 1920 – June 26, 2005) was a journalist and radio personality who broadcast using the name Tokyo Mose during and after World War II. Kaner broadcast on U.S. Army Radio, at first to offer comic rejoinders to the propaganda broadcasts of Tokyo Rose and then as a parody to entertain U.S. troops abroad. In U.S.-occupied Japan, his  jingle was sung to the tune of "London Bridge is Falling Down" and became so popular with Japanese children and G.I.s that the U.S. military's Stars and Stripes newspaper called it "the Japanese occupation theme song." In 1946, Elsa Maxwell referred to Kaner as "the breath of home to unknown thousands of our young men when they were lonely."

Popular culture
Tokyo Rose has been the subject of songs, movies, and documentaries:
1945: The Mr. Hook propaganda cartoon Tokyo Woes, directed by Bob Clampett and featuring Seaman Hook. The cartoon's titular character (voiced by an uncredited Sara Berner) is a parody of Tokyo Rose broadcasts. Tokyo Rose is portrayed as an overly enthusiastic, crooked-toothed Japanese woman speaking on a propaganda broadcast with a loud voice and an American accent. When she criticizes war bonds, Seaman Hook fires a projectile from a naval gun to blow up Japan.
1945: Tokyo Rose "Voice of Truth", five-minute film short produced by the U.S. Treasury Department to promote public support of the 7th war loan.
1946: Tokyo Rose, movie drama directed by Lew Landers. Lotus Long played "Tokyo Rose", a "seductive jap traitress"; Byron Barr played the G.I. protagonist sent to kidnap her.
1949: In the musical South Pacific, sailors mention getting "advice from Tokyo Rose" in the song "There Is Nothing Like a Dame".
1957: The Hollywood service comedy Joe Butterfly, about U.S. military journalists in Japan just after World War II, includes a fictionalized subplot about the search for the "real" Tokyo Rose.
1957: In the movie The Bridge on the River Kwai, a Tokyo Rose broadcast is briefly heard on the demolition team's portable radio.
1958: In the movie , a Tokyo Rose broadcast details ships and sailors lost at sea based on information gained from trash jettisoned by U.S. submarines.
1959: In the movie Operation Petticoat, a Tokyo Rose broadcast warns the crew of a U.S. submarine to surrender.
1960: The Andy Griffith Show makes a brief reference to Tokyo Rose in the episode titled "Stranger in Town". Andy is trying to persuade his deputy, Barney Fife, that he's being unreasonably suspicious of the stranger in town. "Say, do you reckon he could be a foreign spy?" Barney asks. Andy replies, "He don't sound foreign to me." Barney says, "They learn to talk better than any of us! Remember Tokyo Rose?" 
1969: The Story of "Tokyo Rose", a CBS-TV and WGN radio documentary written and produced by Bill Kurtis.
1974: UK rock band Chapman Whitney Streetwalkers recorded a song named "Tokyo Rose" for their album Chapman Whitney Streetwalkers.
1976: Tokyo Rose, CBS-TV documentary segment on 60 Minutes.
1976: "Harbor Lights", a successful song by Boz Scaggs on his album Silk Degrees, begins with the line "Son of a Tokyo Rose, I was bound to wander from home".
1977: "Tokyo Rose," title of a song by American metal band Riot (now known as Riot V) as part of their first album, "Rock City." The band would also go on to reference Tokyo Rose in several other songs, such as "Feel the Same," and "The Land of the Rising Sun."
1978: Dutch rock band Focus released a song entitled "Tokyo Rose" on their album Focus con Proby.
1984: Italo-disco group City-O' released a song entitled "Rose of Tokyo".
1985: Canadian rock band Idle Eyes had a Top 20 success in their homeland with the song "Tokyo Rose" from their self-titled debut album. The song's narrator addresses his lover, saying she "tells a story like Tokyo Rose".
1987: American heavy metal band Shok Paris released the song "Tokyo Rose" on their 1987 album Steel and Starlight. It's about a lonely G.I. who fell in love with the propaganda broadcaster during the war, and remembers her voice many years later.
1988: Canadian singer-songwriter Joni Mitchell mentions "Tokyo Rose on the radio" in her song "The Tea Leaf Prophecy (Lay Down Your Arms)" on the album Chalk Mark in a Rainstorm.
1989: American composer and musician Van Dyke Parks released a concept album titled Tokyo Rose, on the subject of American and Japanese relations.
1992: In season 7 episode 5 ("Where's Charlie?") of the American television situation comedy The Golden Girls: terminally naive Rose Nylund mistakenly believes her roommate Blanche Devereaux's beau has left Blanche for Tokyo Rose.
1995: Tokyo Rose: Victim of Propaganda, A&E Biography documentary, hosted by Peter Graves, available on VHS (AAE-14023).
1997: the Vigilantes of Love released the song "Tokyo Rose" on their album Slow Dark Train.
2002: Japanese band Cali Gari released the song "Tokyo Rose au Monde Club" on their album Dai 7 Jikkenshitsu.
2010: In his dissent from  Justice Stevens remarked: "If taken seriously, our colleagues' assumption that the identity of a speaker has no relevance to the Government's ability to regulate political speech would lead to some remarkable conclusions. Such an assumption would have accorded the propaganda broadcasts to our troops by "Tokyo Rose" during World War II the same protection as speech by Allied commanders".
2011: American country-rockabilly band Whiskey Kill, released the song "Tokyo Rose", the initial track for their debut album Pissed Off Betty.

Other uses
The first registered rock group using the name Tokyo Rose was formed in the summer of 1980. They are most known for their video which tells the story of the war time Tokyo Rose. Tokyo Rose is also the name of an emo/pop band hailing from New Jersey.

In 2019, Burnt Lemon Theatre brought the musical theatre production Tokyo Rose to the Edinburgh Fringe Festival, and New Diorama Theatre. An extended version toured in 2021 in several UK cities, accompanied by the release of a cast album.

See also
Lord Haw-Haw – propagandist who broadcast from Nazi Germany during World War II
Mildred Gillars – propagandist who broadcast from Nazi Germany during World War II
Rita Zucca – propagandist who broadcast from Fascist Italy during World War II
Mitsu Yashima – the American propagandist equivalent of Tokyo Rose.
Agnes Bernelle - or Vicki, the British propagandist equivalent of Tokyo Rose, announcer for broadcasts directed at German navy crews
Radiostacja Wanda (Südstern Aktion) – Nazi Germany radio station broadcasting propaganda directed at Polish II Corps fighting in the Italian Campaign (World War II)
Seoul City Sue – propagandist who broadcast from North Korea during the Korean War
Pyongyang Sally – propagandist who broadcast from North Korea during the Korean War
Hanoi Hannah – propagandist who broadcast from North Vietnam during the Vietnam War
Axis Sally
Paul Ferdonnet, the Stuttgart traitor
Philippe Henriot
Ezra Pound
P. G. Wodehouse – English propagandist used in German radio broadcasts during World War II
Radio Königsberg

References

Bibliography

External links

 Veterans Remember "Tokyo Rose" Oral History Project (University of Montana Archives)
 "The Zero Hour" show with Tokyo Rose in 1944 at The Internet Archive 
 "Zero Hour" broadcasts archived at EarthStation1.com
 "Zero Hour" broadcast (excerpt) and commentary by Iva Toguri D'Aquino ("Orphan Ann") in 1945, at YouTube.com
 F.B.I. file on Tokyo Rose at vault.fbi.gov
 "The Zero Hour" show 8-14-1944,  music with "Ann the Orphan," Iva Toguri D'Aquino, a Japanese-American dubbed "Tokyo Rose" by the American military
 
 "Tokyo Woes"- Voice of Mel Blanc (of Bugs Bunny fame) in this U.S. Navy cartoon. Because they wanted to keep this a secret, all original negatives were destroyed shortly after release.

American expatriates in Japan
American radio DJs
Anti-Japanese sentiment in the United States
Collective pseudonyms
Japan–United States relations
Japanese people of World War II
Race-related controversies in radio
Women in war in East Asia
Women in World War II
American women radio presenters
Nicknames
Nicknames in radio